The name Jewel has been used for three tropical cyclones in the Eastern Pacific Ocean:

 Hurricane Jewel (1967)
 Tropical Storm Jewel (1971)
 Hurricane Jewel (1975)

Pacific hurricane set index articles